Blow'n Chunks is the first live album by San Francisco-based punk rock band Flipper, released in 1984 by ROIR. The recordings originate from a show performed at CBGB on Thanksgiving Day of 1983.

Track listing 
 Way of the World
 The Lights, the Sound, the Rhythm, the Noise
 Shed No Tears
 Love Canal
 Ha Ha Ha
 In Your Arms
 Life Is Cheap
 In Life My Friend
 Get Away
 Life
 Sacrifice
 If I Can't Be Drunk
 Ice Cold Beer

Personnel 
 Ted Falconi – guitar
 Steve DePace – drums
Bruce Loose – vocals, bass
 Will Shatter – vocals, bass

References 

1984 live albums
Flipper (band) albums